The Hasselblad Award (in full: Hasselblad Foundation International Award in Photography) is an award granted to "a photographer recognized for major achievements".

History 
The award—and the Hasselblad Foundation—was set up from the estate of Erna and Victor Hasselblad. Victor Hasselblad was the inventor of the Hasselblad Camera System.

The award includes a cash prize of SEK 2,000,000 (~€200,000), a gold medal, diploma, and an exhibition at the Hasselblad Center in the Göteborg Museum of Art in Gothenburg, Sweden.

Winners 

1980 Lennart Nilsson
1981 Ansel Adams
1982 Henri Cartier-Bresson
1984 Manuel Álvarez Bravo
1985 Irving Penn
1986 Ernst Haas
1987 Hiroshi Hamaya
1988 Édouard Boubat
1989 Sebastião Salgado
1990 William Klein
1991 Richard Avedon
1992 Josef Koudelka
1993 Sune Jonsson
1994 Susan Meiselas
1995 Robert Häusser
1996 Robert Frank
1997 Christer Strömholm
1998 William Eggleston
1999 Cindy Sherman
2000 Boris Mikhailov
2001 Hiroshi Sugimoto
2002 Jeff Wall
2003 Malick Sidibé
2004 Bernd and Hilla Becher
2005 Lee Friedlander
2006 David Goldblatt
2007 Nan Goldin
2008 Graciela Iturbide
2009 Robert Adams
2010 Sophie Calle
2011 Walid Raad
2012 Paul Graham
2013 Joan Fontcuberta
 2014 Miyako Ishiuchi
 2015 Wolfgang Tillmans
2016 Stan Douglas
2017 Rineke Dijkstra
2018 Oscar Muñoz
2019 Daidō Moriyama
2020 Alfredo Jaar
2022 Dayanita Singh
2023 Carrie Mae Weems

References

External links 

Awards established in 1980
Photography awards
Photography in Sweden